Bahamo is a town located in the Central African Republic.

Populated places in Ouaka